Ralph Turner may refer to:

 Ralph H. Turner (1919—2014), American sociologist
 Ralph Lilley Turner (1888—1983), British philologist